Gorgan is a city in Golestan Province, Iran.

Gorgan may also refer to:
 Gorgan, Kermanshah, village in Kermanshah Province, Iran
 Gorgan, Markazi, village in Markazi Province, Iran
 other name for German, Iran, village in Kharqan Rural District, Bastam District, Shahrud County, Semnan Province, Iran
 Gorgan-e Bitaraf, another village in Kharqan Rural District, Bastam District, Shahrud County, Semnan Province, Iran
 Gorgan County, in Golestan Province, Iran
 Gürgan, village in Baku, Azerbaijan
 Gorgan, a village in the commune Cenade, Alba County, Romania
 Gorgan (river), a tributary of the Cozd in Brașov County, Romania
 Great Wall of Gorgan, ancient defensive fortifications located near the above-named Gorgan in Golestan Province
 Gorganrud River, a river in northeastern Iran
 Hyrcania